Trichromia albicollis, is a moth in the family Erebidae. It was described by George Hampson in 1905. It is found in French Guiana, Guyana and Bolivia.

References

Moths described in 1905
albicollis